West Cocalico Township is a township in northeastern Lancaster County, Pennsylvania, United States. The population was 7,491 at the 2020 census.

History
Cocalico Township was divided into East Cocalico and West Cocalico Townships in 1838. Among the township's historical sites listed on the National Register of Historic Places are Reinholds Station Trinity Chapel, Furnace Hills Tenant House, and Henry Walter House.

Geography
West Cocalico is the northernmost township in Lancaster County. Unincorporated communities in the township include Cocalico, Union House, Blainsport, Reinholds, Schoeneck, and part of Stevens.

Demographics

As of the census of 2000, there were 6,967 people, 2,298 households, and 1,888 families living in the township.  The population density was 252.6 people per square mile (97.5/km).  There were 2,383 housing units at an average density of 86.4/sq mi (33.4/km).  The racial makeup of the township was 98.31% White, 0.32% African American, 0.09% Native American, 0.39% Asian, 0.42% from other races, and 0.49% from two or more races. Hispanic or Latino of any race were 1.08% of the population.

There were 2,298 households, out of which 42.1% had children under the age of 18 living with them, 73.7% were married couples living together, 5.6% had a female householder with no husband present, and 17.8% were non-families. 14.8% of all households were made up of individuals, and 5.7% had someone living alone who was 65 years of age or older.  The average household size was 2.99 and the average family size was 3.33.

In the township the population was spread out, with 31.3% under the age of 18, 6.7% from 18 to 24, 31.0% from 25 to 44, 21.0% from 45 to 64, and 10.1% who were 65 years of age or older.  The median age was 34 years. For every 100 females, there were 98.4 males.  For every 100 females age 18 and over, there were 97.9 males.

The median income for a household in the township was $53,045, and the median income for a family was $57,152. Males had a median income of $40,077 versus $24,184 for females. The per capita income for the township was $20,306.  About 1.2% of families and 2.6% of the population were below the poverty line, including 1.8% of those under age 18 and 4.6% of those age 65 or over.

References

External links

Populated places established in 1732
Townships in Lancaster County, Pennsylvania
Townships in Pennsylvania